The National Football League Offensive Player of the Year Award is an annual American football award given by various organizations to the National Football League (NFL) player who is considered the top offensive player during the regular season. Organizations which issue the award include the Associated Press (AP), Pro Football Writers of America (PFWA) and Sporting News. The AP's award is recognized at the annual NFL Honors ceremony.

Winners overview

See also
 List of National Football League awards

References

National Football League trophies and awards